Rally Mexico, formerly known as Rally America is a round of the FIA World Rally Championship. The rally entered the championship schedule in the 2004 season.  The event's itinerary is based in the state of Guanajuato.  The stages take place in the environs of cities of León, Silao, and Guanajuato; rally headquarters being located in León.

Rally México features the highest stages of all WRC championship rounds, as high as 2700 meters; engines in WRC cars lose up to 20% of their power in these stages as a result, due to the lower air pressure at such altitudes.

In 2004, the Organising Committee won the Inmarsat Star of the Rally award for his first organized WRC rally. In 2008, the Organising Committee of the Corona Rally Mexico won the Abu Dhabi Spirit of the Rally award for the great work done in the organization of the WRC event.

History
Rally America, later known as Corona Rally Mexico and now Rally Guanajuato Mexico, was created in 1979 through a big spirit of co-operation by the two largest clubs in Mexico: Club Automovilístico Francés de México (CAF) and the Rally Automovil Club (RAC). Both clubs have a long history of sporting competition, so their collaboration was a big step forward for rallying in the country. It was originally hosted in the State of Mexico and ran continuously until 1985.

After an absence of six years, the event ran again in 1991 and followed the route of El Paso de Cortés, between two of Mexico's largest volcanoes. Following the cancellation of the 1992 edition of the event, the CAF opted for a different concept: a short rally with a high percentage of special stages. The result was the very successful 1993 edition that was held in Valle de Bravo under the direction of Gilles Spitalier. The rally was awarded the Rally of the Year title by the Mexican National Rally Commission.

The Organising Committee then took over the running of the Rally de las 24 Horas, the CAF's flagship event, and, for this reason, Rally America was not staged again until 1996, when the internationalization of the project began.

The CAF and its new promoting partner, Rallymex, moved the event to the US border in Ensenada, Baja California, for two years, where it started to attract international entries.

In 1998, the organizers decided to rename the event and move it to Leon, Guanajuato. With a long-term business plan focusing on inclusion in the World Rally Championship in place, the event ran again in 1999 and 2000, stepping up a gear each year. From 2001 to 2003, the organizers went for observation by the FIA, successfully running the event on each occasion.

The 2003 Corona Rally Mexico – the 17th in the history of the rally – proved to be the crucial turning point. New facilities at the Poliforum Expo Center were groundbreaking in the sport and this, combined with one of the most compact routes ever, put the event firmly in the frame for World Championship status. A total of 45 crews representing 11 countries crossed the start ramp in Guanajuato during one of the most spectacular opening ceremonies seen in the sport.

Corona Rally Mexico made its debut in the expanded 16-round World Rally Championship in the 2004 season, running successfully as the third round of the series and implementing a raft of regulation changes introduced by the FIA for the season. In 2005, the event again ran as the third round and was the first full gravel event of the year, attracting 44 crews representing 17 nations. For the first time in their series, the FIA Junior World Rally Championship contenders also ventured outside Europe, Corona Rally Mexico being the second event in its eight-round series.

For the 2007 edition, 21º Corona Rally México, the route was re-designed, making it more compact for a total of 850 kilometers. An all-time record for the championship. The rally was also made the centrepiece conclusion of the new NACAM Rally Championship regional series when it was created in 2008. After that first year the NACAM championship shifted its Mexican round to the Rally Sierra del Tigre.

In 2009, the Rally was run as the International Rally of Nations. In 2010 amid a year-long fiesta to mark the 100th anniversary of the Mexican Revolution and the 200th anniversary of its independence, the WRC returned to León.

From 2017, the rally is again part of the NACAM Rally Championship.

Winners
Pink background indicates that in that year the rally was not part of WRC calendar.

Multiple winners

References

External links
 Rally México – Official website

 
Recurring sporting events established in 1993
Mexico
Rally competitions in Mexico